Bhimeshwar, (formerly Charikot), is a municipality in north-eastern Nepal and the headquarters of Dolakha District in Bagmati Province that was established in 1997 by merging the former Village development committees Charikot, Dolakha Town, Makaibari and Mati. At the time of the 2011 Nepal census it had a population of 32,486 people living in 8,639 individual households. The town is located at an altitude of 1554 metres (5101 feet). The name of the district Dolakha came from Dolakha Town situated north-east of the headquarters Charikot Bazaar.

Boundaries
The region is bordered by the Sun Kosi River on the west and the Khimti Khola River on the east. It is divided unequally by the River Tama Koshi, proportionately two-thirds to the west of the river and one-third to the east.

To the north east lies the impressive Rolwaling Himal to the western edge of which are such peaks as Gauri Shankar and Melungtse. Gauri Shankar is synonymous with the god Shiva and his consort Parvati.

Places around Dolakha District and Bhimeshwar Municipality

Dolakha Bhimeshwar

This is the one of the oldest temple of Dolakha, this temple is situated at toward the east of Charikot Bazaar which is 4.5 kilometers.  Thousands of pilgrims come to this temple every year. According to the Hindu mythology Bhimsen is one of the brothers of Pandava, during their 12 years exile they spent a year in Dolakha and they used to speak a language for that year called Dolakhali Newari language.  Newari people regarded the Bhimeswar as a supreme god.

Kotihom
A very religious and historic place situated at the northern-east side of the main town. Approximately 25 mins of walk from the bus stop of Charikot. A Priest from Kalinchok, another religious place in far Northern Himalayan region of the Charikot, initiated the work to establish this holy shrine.  The late King Birendra Bikram Shah Birendra of Nepal and late Queen Aishwarya Rajya Laxmi Devi Shah Aishwarya of Nepal were invited for the inauguration of this shrine. In Nepal, Kings and Queens were regarded as reincarnation of the Protector of all living beings, Vishnu, so it was a huge ceremony for the people of Charikot on that auspicious occasion of their visit and inauguration. Every 12 years, people of Charikot and around visit the place to celebrate "Holm", a religious mass act without any scarification of living creature for peace of the Nation and the World.

Pashupati
A temple situated at the top of a hill near Purano Bazaar.  People like to go there for worship every morning. It is similar to the Pashupati temple of Kathmandu in a sense it also has Shiva Linga.  The temple is surrounded by walls and within its perimeters is Lali Guras Youth Club.

Gumba
It is a monastery at the top  of the other corner of this beautiful town in south. A wide road enough for a bus takes from Satdobato through the residential area. It is in wide and open field and has scenic view of almost all the area of Dolakha District-Mahangkal, Mude, Kalinchok, Charikot, Dolakha, Gaurishankar Himalayan Range, Tamakoshi. It is a truly breathtaking spot for scenic sips.

Mahangkal
When you have sorrows and hurdles, they say, go and pray in this holy place. Females are prohibited to enter into the main temple for unknown reasons. It lies near the bank of Charnawoti river which nearby joins the Tamakoshi. You can walk or you can take ride with local bus or bike.  A half-hour tour is available. Places of interest include:
Tundekhel-Playground for the whole town and any other festivals.
Sailung (more than hundred small hills)
Deurali-approximately 30–45 minutes walk from charikot
Kalinchok
Tripurasundari—in the Dolakha Bazar itself
Sundrawati
Charnawati--" Charange" or "चराङे ": around 9 Kilometers west of charikot.
Tamakoshi
Boch
Jiri—around 50 kilometers to the east of Charikot. 
Eco Himal Trekking Route
Jilu Village "Land of Food and Devotes"
Lamidanda
Mahankal "Brinda Ban" where you could see the magnificent views of Mt. Gaurishanker with Rolwaling range and white river Tamakoshi
Tsho Rolpa Trekking Route
Khimti hydro project

Geography
To the northwest the mountains slope gently downwards towards the ancient pass of Kuti that starts above the Tibetan town of Khasa and follows the waters of the Bhote Kosi from Tibet. The river flows past Kodari and Tatopani (Hot Springs) on the Nepalese side and gradually rushes down into an ever-widening stream of water that becomes the Sun Kosi.

The Khimti Khola drains down from a region of five lakes called Panch Pokhari. They have a specific place in legend and go by the names of Mohi (buttermilk), Jata (hair), Dudh (milk), Bahula (insane), and Bhut (ghost). People believe that if one bathes in Bahula Pokhari one will become insane, whereas the Ghost Lake cannot bear the smell of human perspiration and will pull one inside its murky waters to a certain death if you as much as venture near it. The Khimti Khola joins the Tama Koshi, as do the Khare Khola and Rolwaling Khola to the northeast and the Sangawati, Dolti and Charnewati Kholas to the west.

The riverine valleys open out into massive volcanic folds. Sub-tropical settlements on the banks of rivers boast banana trees, guava, and an abundance of fish. Above the banks hover the terraced fields of paddy, make, wheat, and millet.

Between Bhimeshwar and Jiri the road descends to 845 metres and is bordered by plantations of sugar-cane. Above these slopes are forests of dark oak, fir and pine, interspersed with tangles of bracken and fem all in the embrace of clinging orchids and coloured in the springtime by the rhododendrons, the national flower of Nepal.

Mosses cling to the shaded rocks and in the forests are wild strawberries, loganberries, red berries and thyme.

Destination

Dolakha is approximately 139 km from the Capital of Nepal, Kathmandu. Regular-Local and Express bus services are available from the Old Bus Station. All the Bus services are operated by Araniko Transportation Authority as per Syndicate System. Old Bus Park is situated opposite Play Ground-Tundekhel.

Students can get 45% discount in regular bus fare. Anyone can get a ride from virtually any spot in the route. Previously, one could ride in the hood but recently the law was passed not to allow anyone to ride over the hood.

The popular destination from Old Bus Park en route to Dolakha are many. Banepa, Dhulikhel, Dolal-Ghat, Lamo-Sangu (Long Bridge), Khadi Chaur (Middle Eastern Ground), and Mude. Tourists and local enjoy the travel and scenic views, foods on the route equally. Dolal-Ghat and Khadi Chaur are major destination for fish, Dolal-Ghat for vegetables (esp. tomatoes), Dhulikhel for restaurants and resorts.

Rafting in the Sunkoshi (Gold River) and Tamba koshi is also a major attraction.

Schools and colleges

Government schools
Shree Kutidanda Higher Secondary School (Makaibari)
Shree Kalinchwok Higher Secondary School (Charikot)
Shree Pashupati Kanya Mandir (Charikot) 
Shree Bhim Higher Secondary School (Dolakha)
Shree Sharba Secondary School (Jilu) 
Shree Mahendradayo Higher secondary School (Mati)

Private boarding schools
The Rising Star English Boarding School (Charikot)
Mount Valley English Boarding School (Charikot)
Tripura Glorious Academy (Charikot)
Apline English Boarding School (Charikot)
 Aankura English Boarding School (Dharam Ghar)
 Gaurishanker English Boarding School (Charikot) 
 Apex English Boarding School (Charikot)
Kalinchowk English Boarding School (Charikot)
 Modern Nepal English School (Charikot)

Government college
Gaurishankar Multiple Campus (Charikot)
Charikot Campus (Charikot)

Private college
HIMSE Academy (Charikot)

Government offices, Hospitals and Nursing Homes

Government
District Education Office
District Health Post
Primary Health Centre

Private Hospitals
Tsho Rolpa General Hospital and Nursing College
Dirghau General Hospital
Gaurishankar General Hospital (formerly under Korean aid)

Government offices
Bhimeshwar Municipality Office
District Public Health Office
Road and construction Office

Ethnic groups
Newars are mostly involved in small local business, Nepali in clothing stores.

Brahmins-Indo-Aryan; Referred to twice-born. They have been the dominant priestly cast of Nepal since Prithvi Narayan Shah of Gorkha unified the states of Nepal into a single Kingdom.

Jirel-Tibeto-Mongoloid; It is believed that they may be descendants of original inhabitants of Tibet and Tibetan tribes with whom they inter-married. Broadly speaking, Jirels have retained a Buddhist tradition. However, they employ Hindu Brahmins for many rituals. This behavior may date back to the Rana rule, a Hindu dynasty. They live in Jiri and the village nearby. They believe they originated as a result of trade between this region and the adjoining regions in Tibet. At death ceremonies, a Buddhist tradition prevails. However, for many domestic ceremonies they call a Brahmin priest and adhere to the Brahmanical tradition. This strange mixture can be explained by their mixed ethnic origins and that sometimes amongst certain of the middle-hill peoples there is no hard, dividing line.

Other- Ksehtri, Magar, Newar, Sherpa, Tamang, Thami

Media 
To promote local culture Bhimeshwar has two community radio stations Sailung (104 MHz) and Radio Kalinchowk (106.4 MHz).

References

External links

 UN map of the municipalities of Dolakha District
Web site about Dolakha

Accommodation 

 Charikot Panorama Resort

Populated places in Dolakha District
Municipalities in Bagmati Province
Nepal municipalities established in 1997